Bad Hair is a 2013 internationally co-produced drama film written and directed by Mariana Rondón, starring Samantha Castillo and child actor Samuel Lange. It was screened in the Contemporary World Cinema section at the 2013 Toronto International Film Festival.

The film has been praised by critics for its performances by Castillo and Lange. It deals with many topics ranging from adolescence and parent-child tensions to gender identity and sexuality. Its setting in Venezuelan society also contributes to many of the film's themes.

Plot
Junior, a nine-year-old, lives in Caracas in a shoddy apartment with his widowed mother and baby brother. He has "pelo malo," a Hispanic term for curly, Afro-textured hair, which he constantly attempts to straighten using various methods, including smearing mayonnaise into it. His hair is a source of frustration for both him and his mother, the latter because she does not approve of his obsession with his looks, believing that it is not normal behavior for a boy of his age. 

Junior and his neighbourhood friend, "La Niña," spend a lot of time in her apartment watching Venezuelan beauty pageants on TV. La Niña is a classic "girly girl," dressing like a princess and playing with makeup and dolls. Junior also enjoys the pageants, and when the time comes for them to take their school pictures, La Niña chooses to dress as a princess while Junior wants to dress as a singer with straight hair.

His mother does not approve of his constant grooming and takes it to be a sign of his homosexuality. Twice she takes him to the doctor to find out if he is developing "normally," later being direct and asking the doctor if he is gay. When the doctor suggests he needs a stronger male influence at home, she brings home her boss and has sex with him, forcing Junior to watch them through his open bedroom door. Junior rolls over in his bed in an attempt to look away.

Eventually his mother gives him an ultimatum- either shave his hair or move in with his grandmother, an older black woman who wants Junior to act more feminine as opposed to his mother's strictness.

Cast
 Beto Benites as El Jefe
 Samantha Castillo as Marta
 Samuel Lange Zambrano as Junior
 Nelly Ramos as Carmen
 María Emilia Sulbarán as La Niña

References

External links
 

2013 films
2013 drama films
2013 LGBT-related films
Venezuelan drama films
German drama films
Peruvian drama films
Argentine drama films
Venezuelan LGBT-related films
German LGBT-related films
Peruvian LGBT-related films
Argentine LGBT-related films
2010s Peruvian films
2010s Spanish-language films
Films about children